Fernando Béjar Durá (born 6 October 1980) is a Spanish retired footballer who played as a midfielder.

Club career
Béjar was born in Novelda, Province of Alicante. During his career, spent mainly in the lower leagues and with local Hércules CF, he also appeared briefly in Segunda División, twice for Hércules in the 1998–99 season – with relegation – and 14 times for neighbours Alicante CF in the 2008–09 campaign, meeting the same fate.

Over the course of 12 seasons, Béjar amassed Segunda División B totals of 269 games and 35 goals.

External links

1980 births
Living people
People from Vinalopó Mitjà
Sportspeople from the Province of Alicante
Spanish footballers
Footballers from the Valencian Community
Association football midfielders
Segunda División players
Segunda División B players
Tercera División players
Hércules CF B players
Hércules CF players
Villajoyosa CF footballers
Benidorm CF footballers
Alicante CF footballers
AD Alcorcón footballers
CD Castellón footballers
Ontinyent CF players
Novelda CF players
Yeclano Deportivo players